Gründau (in its upper course: Litterbach) is a river of Hesse, Germany. It flows into the Kinzig near Langenselbold.

See also
List of rivers of Hesse

References

Rivers of Hesse
Rivers of Germany